The 2006–07 Wichita Thunder season was the 15th season of the CHL franchise in Wichita, Kansas.

Regular season

Division standings

Playoffs
The Wichita Thunder qualified for the playoffs for the fourth straight season. They lost the opening round best-of-seven series against the Bossier-Shreveport Mudbugs 2 - 4. Ryan Lauzon and Travis Clayton both lead the Thunder with six points each.

See also
2006–07 CHL season

External links
2006–07 Wichita Thunder season at Hockey Database

Wichita Thunder seasons
Wich